Louis G. Cowan (December 12, 1909 – November 18, 1976) was a president of the CBS broadcasting network in the United States and a creator of quiz shows (including Quiz Kids radio program, Stop the Music, and The $64,000 Question for television), a television producer and was director of the Voice of America from 1943–1945.

He and his wife died in a house fire in New York City, believed to have been caused by “smoking carelessness”.  Survivors included his sons Paul Cowan and Geoffrey Cowan.

Early life
Cowan was born Louis Cohen in 1909 in Chicago but changed his name at age 21.  Cowan's parents were Orthodox Jews.  His father was Jacob Cohen, a failed businessman, and his mother was Hetty Smitz Cohen. He graduated from the University of Chicago, where he met his wife Pauline "Polly" Spiegel, granddaughter of Joseph Spiegel, founder of the Spiegel catalog.

Career
He produced more than 50 programs during his three years with CBS, including Captain Kangaroo, and won two Peabody Awards.  After he left CBS, he founded Chilmark Press, was director of the Brandeis University Communications Center, special lecturer at the Columbia University Graduate School of Journalism and founded the William E. Wiener Oral History Library for the American Jewish Committee.

Personal life
In 1976, Cowan died along with his wife in a house fire. They had four children: Paul Cowan, Geoffrey Cowan, Holly Cowan Shulman, and Liza Cowan.

Legacy
Cowan's papers and archives, along with the archives of Chilmark Press, are held at Columbia University.

References

External links
 

1909 births
1976 deaths
20th-century American Jews
Presidents of CBS Entertainment
Accidental deaths in New York (state)
University of Chicago alumni
Television producers from Illinois
Voice of America people
Spiegel family
Deaths from fire in the United States
Brandeis University people